The Thomas Fitch Rowland Prize is awarded by the American Society of Civil Engineers (ASCE).   It was started in 1882, and is named for Thomas Fitch Rowland, who endowed it in 1884.

An author who belongs to the ASCE can be nominated if they have published a print article in an ASCE journal in the last twelve months.

List of awardees 
Source: ASCE
1883  Gustav Lindenthal for "Rebuilding the Monongahela Bridge" Smithfield Street Bridge
1884  Hamilton Smith, Jr., author of "Hydraulics, The Flow Of Water Through Orifices, Over Weirs, And Through Open Conduits And Pipes"(1886)   
1885  A. M. Wellington
1886  Charles Conrad Schneider
1887  William Metcalf
1888  Clemens Herschel
1889  James D. Schuyler for work on "Construction of the Sweetwater Dam" 
1890  Octave Chanute, John Findley Wallace, and William H. Breithaupt, an engineer for railways  
1891  William H. Burr
1892  Samuel M. Rowe, Stillman W. Robinson (brother of Albert Alonzo Robinson), and Henry H. Quimby, all for The Red Rock Cantilever Bridge
1893  William Murray Black
1894  David L. Barnes
1895  William R. Hill
1896  H. St. L. Coppee, President of the American Society of Railroad Superintendents
1897  Arthur L. Adams
1898  Henry C. Goldmark
1899  Richard S. Buck, designer of the Niagara Railway Arch Bridge, and the Chief Engineer for the Manhattan Bridge
1900-1999
1900  Allen Hazen
1901  L. G. Montony Ninety-Sixth Street Power Station of the Metropolitan Street Railway Company of New York City 
1902  William W. Harts for "Description of Coos Bay, Oregon and Improvement of its Entrance by the Government" 
1903  George W. Fuller
1904  George Cecil Kenyon  for "Dock Improvements at Liverpool" 
1905  Charles L. Harrison and Silas H. Woodard for "Lake Cheesman Dam and Reservoir" (Colorado) 
1906  George B. Francis and W.F. Dennis for "The Scranton Tunnel of the Lackawanna and Wyoming Valley Railroad" 
1907  James D. Schuyler for "Recent practice in Hydraulic-Fill Dam Construction" 
1908  Edward E. Wall for "Water Purification in St. Louis, Mo."  
1909  William J. Wilgus for "The Electrification of the Suburban Zone of the New York Central Railroad ..."
1910  John H. Gregory
1923  F. W. Peek, Jr.
1944  Eugene L. Grant
1945  Donald N. Becker
1946  James B. Hays
1947  Robert F. Blanks ; Harmon S. Meissner
1948  M. M. Fitzhugh; J. S. Miller; Karl Terzaghi
1949  Harold M. Westergaard
1950  R. N. Bergendoff ; Josef Sorkin
1951  William K. Boyd and Charles R. Foster
1952  Clarence E. Keefer
1953  E. Montford Fucik
1954  A. Warren Simonds
1955  Maurice N. Quade
1956  Jonathan Jones 

 2000-present
2001 Keith R. Molenaar; Simon P. Washington; James E. Diekman
2002 Lawrence C. Bank; T. Russell Gentry; Kenneth H. Nuss; Stephanie H. Hurd; Anthony J. Lamanna; Stephen J. Duich; Ben Oh
2003 Simaan Abourizk ; Dany Hajjar
2004 Ronie Navon ; Eytan Goldschmidt
2005 J. M. Lopes Cordeiro ; Paulo Jorge De Sousa Cruz
2006 Mark R. Svinkin
2007 Amr A. Kandil; Khaled El-Rayes
2009 John E. Taylor
2011 Gunnar Lucko; Eddy M. Rojas
2014  Sungjoo Hwang, Moonseo Park, Hyun-Soo Lee, SangHyun Lee, and Hyunsoo Kim, for "Dynamic Feasibility Analysis of the Housing Supply Strategies in a Recession: Korean Housing Market."
2015 Mounir El Asmar; Awad S. Hanna ;  Wei-Yin Loh
2016 Vitaliy Priven ; Rafael Sacks
2017 Mohammad Ilbeigi; Baabak Ashuri; Soheil Shayegh
2018 Sooyoung Choe; Fernanda L. Leite
2019 Yang-Ping Yao; Yang-Zhi Ruan; Jun Chen; Yi Geng; Xing Zhang; Bing-Yang Liu; Xiao-Peng Zong; Gui-Zhen
2020 Ibahim S. Aboaleb ; Islam El-adaway
2021 Ashtad Javanmardi; S. Alireza Abbasian-Hosseini; Min Liu; Simon M. Hsiang for the paper “Improving Effectiveness of Constraints Removal in Construction Planning Meetings: Information-Theoretic Approach”
2022 Hyosoo Moon, Kwonhyun Kim, Hyun-Soo Lee, Moonseo Park, Trefor P. Williams, Bosik Son, and Jae-Youl Chun for "Cost Performance Comparison of Design-Build and Design-Bid-Build for Building and Civil Projects Using Mediation Analysis”

See also

 List of engineering awards

References  

Awards of the American Society of Civil Engineers